As of December 2021, EGO Airways planned to resume flights to the following scheduled destinations. However as of January 2022, its operational license had been revoked.

References 

Lists of airline destinations